KITZ (1400 AM) is a radio station featuring a News/Talk format. Licensed to Silverdale, Washington, United States, it serves the Puget Sound Region. It is currently owned by KITZ Radio, Inc. consisting of the gun-rights group Second Amendment Foundation and its affiliate, Citizens Committee for the Right to Keep and Bear Arms. Its main studio and production facilities are in Port Orchard.

It was launched in 1952 as KTNT in Tacoma, Washington, owned by the Tacoma News Tribune, which also owned KTNT-TV (now KSTW) and KTNT-FM (now KIRO-FM). In 1983, the station became KPMA, which broadcast until 1985.

It was relaunched in 1986 as KITZ, under the ownership of Silversound Broadcasting Company, and its City of License was transferred to Silverdale.

References

External links

ITZ
Radio stations established in 1952
1952 establishments in Washington (state)